Inquisitor odhneri is a species of sea snail, a marine gastropod mollusk in the family Pseudomelatomidae, the turrids and allies.

Description

Distribution
This marine species is endemic to Australia and occurs off Western Australia.

References

 Wells, F.E. 1994. A revision of the Recent Australian species of the turrid genera Inquisitor and Ptychobela. Journal of the Malacological Society of Australasia 15: 71-102

External links
 

odhneri
Gastropods described in 1994
Gastropods of Australia